Tove Paule (born 11 January 1951) is a Norwegian sports official.

She was the secretary general of the Norwegian Gymnastics Federation from 1995 to 2000, and became the president of the Norwegian Olympic and Paralympic Committee and Confederation of Sports in 2007. She withdrew in mid-2011, and instead ran for election to Drammen city council for the Conservative Party.
 
She represents the sports club Vestfossen IF. She is a sister of Torbjørn Paule, and aunt of Geir and Tor Håkon Holte.

References

1951 births
Living people
People from Buskerud
Norwegian sports executives and administrators
Conservative Party (Norway) politicians
Politicians from Drammen
Norwegian sportsperson-politicians